
Year 404 BC was a year of the pre-Julian Roman calendar. At the time, it was known as the Year of the Tribunate of Volusus, Cossus, Fidenas, Ambustus, Maluginensis and Rutilus (or, less frequently, year 350 Ab urbe condita). The denomination 404 BC for this year has been used since the early medieval period, when the Anno Domini calendar era became the prevalent method in Europe for naming years.

Events 
 By place 
 Greece 
 The Athenian leader Cleophon continues to urge resistance against the Peloponnesians, but the situation becomes desperate and he is arrested, condemned to death and executed.
 April 25 – Athens, full of refugees and weakened by plague and hunger, capitulates and the Peloponnesian War ends.
 Theramenes secures terms that save the city of Athens from destruction. The Spartans allow Athens to retain its independence. However, Athens loses all its foreign possessions and what is left of its fleet and is required to become an ally of Sparta. The Long Walls around Athens are pulled down. Greek towns across the Aegean Sea in Ionia are again the subjects of the Persian Empire.
 The Spartan general, Lysander, puts in place a puppet government in Athens with the establishment of the oligarchy of the "Thirty Tyrants" under Critias and including Theramenes as a leading member. This government executes a number of citizens and deprives all but a few of their rights.
 Many of Athens' former allies are now ruled by boards of ten (decarchy), often reinforced with garrisons under a Spartan commander (Harmost).
 The Athenian general Thrasybulus is exiled by the Thirty (the oligarchy of Athens), and he retires to Thebes.
 A split develops between Theramenes and Critias who has Theramenes killed (by drinking poison) on charges of treason.
 Emerging after the Spartan victory at Aegospotami, the former Athenian leader, Alcibiades, takes refuge in Phrygia in northwestern Asia Minor with the Persian satrap, Pharnabazus, and seeks their assistance for the Athenians. The Spartans discover his plans and arrange with Pharnabazus to have him assassinated.
 Lysander sails to Samos and conquers it for Sparta.

 Egypt 
 Amyrtaeus of Sais successfully leads a revolt against the Persian Empire's control of the Egyptian delta. He becomes the first (and only) pharaoh of the Twenty-eighth Dynasty.

 Persian Empire 
 The Persian King Darius II dies of an illness in Babylon. He is succeeded by his son Artaxerxes II (Memnon—'the Mindful').
 Darius II's younger son, Cyrus, is accused by Tissaphernes, the satrap of Caria, of plotting his brother Artaxerxes II's murder. On the intercession of Artaxerxes II and Cyrus's mother, Parysatis, however, Cyrus is pardoned and sent back to his satrapy.

Births

Deaths 
 Alcibiades, Athenian statesman (b. c. 450 BC)
 Cleophon, Athenian politician and demagogue
 Darius II Ochus, King of the Persian Empire
 Theramenes, Athenian statesman

References